Thomas Edward Mansell (January 1, 1855 – October 6, 1934) was a 19th-century professional baseball player. He played a total of eleven seasons professionally, from  until . His brothers John and Mike also played baseball professionally.

External links

Major League Baseball outfielders
Troy Trojans players
Syracuse Stars (NL) players
St. Louis Browns (AA) players
Detroit Wolverines players
Cincinnati Red Stockings (AA) players
Columbus Buckeyes players
Auburn (minor league baseball) players
Hornellsville Hornells players
Albany (minor league baseball) players
Washington Nationals (minor league) players
New York Metropolitans (minor league) players
Albany Senators players
Rochester Flour Cities players
Memphis Grays players
Atlanta Atlantas players
Kansas City Cowboys (minor league) players
19th-century baseball players
Sportspeople from Auburn, New York
1855 births
1934 deaths
Baseball players from New York (state)